The Burundi National Olympic Committee (IOC code: BDI) is the National Olympic Committee representing Burundi.

Burundi
 
1990 establishments in Burundi
Olympic
Sports organizations established in 1990